Sparkle in Grey is a Milan, Italy-based Electronica and post-rock project formed in the year 1999 by Matteo Uggeri (Laptop, Electronics and Field Recordings).
In 2005 two new members joined the project: Cristiano Lupo (Guitar and Drums), who was also in previous new-wave/industrial band Norm with Uggeri, and Alberto Carozzi (Bass and Guitar), from the post rock band Yakudoshi.
In 2006 Franz Krostopovic joined the band with Violin and then Keyboards.

History
At the beginning the music of Sparkle in Grey, as a solo project, was essentially an electronic beat and melodies based assembly of soft tunes and delicate rhythms, in a sort of Morr Music/Warp style. So the first record, called The Echoes of Thiiings and issued by the small cult Italian label 'Afe' presents thirteen tracks of remarkable musical poetry. To this record several other musicians, including Nicola Ratti, Telepherique and Pleo, added their contribution with a second CD, called Fadiiing Echoes, which presents remixed versions of the original tracks.

Later on, in 2008, with the addition of guitars, bass, drums and violin, the music enriched with a lot of multiple layers and more complex structures, but always preserving its typical melodic and rhythmical style. The result is A Quiet Place, published by 'Disasters By Choice', that can be described as a sort of new post-rock based on electronics and with strong elements of experimental music (like field recordings and noise).
It's in this direction that the group collaborated with the industrial master M.B./Maurizio Bianchi in 2007, publishing a joint album about the concept of 'clouds', that features the harsh cracking of M.B. and his minimal drones or piano dissonant tunes together with the heartbreaking melodies of Sparkle on Grey.

In 2010 Black Fading records (of Disciplinatha's ex Singer Cristiano Santini) releases "Whale Heart, Whale Heart", a completely new attempt in the field of acoustic music, where the band collaborates with the pop/folk singer and post-rock artist Tex La Homa (Matt Shaw).

In 2011 a group of Italian and Swiss labels publishes "Mexico", an album that mixes the previous influences (post-rock and electronics) with dub, new wave and other genres. It was recorded by Cristiano Santini, mixed by Giuseppe Ielasi and mastered by Andrea Serrapiglio (which collaborates with Carla Bozulich). One of the strange characteristics of the album is the inclusion of a sample by Salvatore Borsellino, brother of Paolo Borsellino, who was killed by the mafia in 1992. It's one of the first political act of the band, that will get deeper into this topics with the following album.

In 2013 "Thursday Evening" was issued as a cooperative effort by two Swiss labels (Old Bicycle Records and Show Me Your Wounds) and two Italian ones (Lizard and Grey Sparkle, the label of the band itself). The album was recorded partially by Mario Bossi at Arci Blob (Arcore) and then by Serrapiglio, while the master was made by Riccardo Gamondi (former member of hip-hop weird band Uoki Toki and known for his collaboration with Violetta Baudegarde and Gianbeppe Succi). A little peeble, whose use is up to the buyer, as a provocation, is included with the CD edition, on whose cover the drawing of Uggeri represent an angry crowd.

In 2014 they released "The Calendar", a mostly acoustic record that includes a booklet with a picture for every month of the year.

In 2015 they released an (anti)split album with the American band Controlled Bleeding entitled "Perversions of the Aging Savant" on the Belgian label Off Records, owned by the occasional drummer of Tuxedomoon, Alain Lefebvre. At the end of the same year they released on their own label Grey Sparkle, "Prohibido Es Cantar", a sort of live celebration of their decade-long career.

راديو إزداغ ( "Brahim Izdag" ) is their 2016 work, in which the 'ethnic influences' already present in previous works became more insistent. The album feats guests such as Osvaldo Arioldi Schwartz, Andrea Serrapiglio, the 'chinoiser' Yan Jun and the Senegalese singer Zacharia Diatta.

The band kept incorporating word music elements, publishing in 2018 a 7" " Mevlanian Ears ", with vocal contribution, in Arabic, by the Egyptian singer Reem Soliman. The B side features the other Italian group Le Forbici di Manitù.

In the same year they published "Milan", dedicated to the city of the band, in which they find new balance between the multiple influences of the four musicians (defined by the magazine Mucchio Selvaggio "the paladins of the non-genre") and to the Italian songwriting tradition. Among the covers we can find the English groups of And Also the Trees and Throbbing Gristle, to reconfirm the steady wave and industrial roots of some of the group members, Uggeri in particular, which recently launched a new project named Barnacles.

A characteristic of the group is also the use of drawings instead of photographs, where the four components are depicted as a funny little men from round shapes ('Roundmen'), with whom they have also realized the video of the song " Goose Game ".

“The music of Sparkle in Grey is always well balanced and extremely intense. “ Denis ‘Monopsone’ (Autres Directions)

“The profound bass-line and the classical violin have something in common with Tuxedomoon, but Sparkle in Grey show they have already achieved a personal and very poetic style.” Vittore Baroni (Rumore)

Interviews

"Metamorfosi industriale", Blow Up, July/Aug 2008

"Gli intona(r)umori", ''Rockerilla, June/July 2008

Radio transmissions
“A blend of electronic and post-rock music, where the acoustics tune in perfectly with the crackling of electronics." Nicola Catalano (Battiti, Radio3)

"Delusion Song: here’s an example of a perfect song." Renato Scuffietti (Radio Popolare)

Selected discography
Two Sing, Too Swing (2021, Dischi di Plastica, stella*nera, Grey Sparkle, Moving Records & Comics, CD)
Milano (2018, stella*nera/ADN/Grey Sparkle/Moving Records & Comics, CD)
Mevlanian Ears (2018, Grey Sparkle, 7")
ﺭﺍﺩﻳﻮ ﺇﺯﺩﺍﻍ (2016, Grey Sparkle/Moving Records & Comics/Old Bicycle, CD)
Es Prohibido Cantar - LIVE 2005-2015 (2015, Grey Sparkle, CD)
Perversions of the Aging Savant, with Controlled Bleeding (2015, Off Records/Old Bicycle, limited edition CD)
The Calendar, (2014, Grey Sparkle/Old Bicycle/Lizard/Moving Records and Comics, Gattolino, CD with book)
Thursday Evening, (2013, Grey Sparkle/Old Bicycle/Lizard/SMYW, CD with peeble)
Goose Game, (2011, Grey Sparkle, CD-R/free download)
Mexico, (2011, Lizard/Grey Sparkle/MCL/Afe/Old Bicycle, CD)
Whale Heart, Whale Heart, with Tex La Homa (2010, Black Fading Records/Grey Sparkle/MCL, LP)
A Quiet Place (2008, Disasters By Choice, CD)
Nefelodhis, with M.B./Maurizio Bianchi (2007, Musica di un Certo Livello/Cold Current, CD)
The Echoes of Thiiings/Fadiiing Echoes (2005, Afe, CD-R)
The Coldest January (2004, ctrl+alt+canc/sine3pm, mp3)

References

External links

Grey Sparkle label website

Italian post-rock groups
Italian progressive rock groups
Electronica music groups
Musical groups from Milan